XHMJ-FM is a radio station on 97.9 FM in Piedras Negras, Coahuila. It is owned by Capital Media and operated by Grupo Región as "Región 97.9 FM".

History
XHMJ began as XEMJ-AM 920, receiving its concession on June 11, 1941. It was owned by Radio Popular Fronteriza, S.A., the concessionaire for the station for 74 years.

It moved to FM in 2012 and was sold to Capital Media in 2015. In 2019, XHMJ was converted from Capital FM (pop) to Capital Máxima (grupera).

On June 8, 2020, XHMJ was one of seven stations to debut the new Lokura FM adult hits brand. However, the station quickly flipped back. On July 29, it was revealed that David Aguillón, a former PRI political figure, would lease Capital's four Coahuila radio stations; the formation of Grupo Región was formally announced on September 14.

References

Radio stations in Coahuila
1941 establishments in Mexico
Radio stations established in 1941